Malcolm Alexander Kersey-Brown (18 November 1942 – 23 November 2015) was an English-born Welsh rugby union, and professional rugby league footballer who played in the 1960s and 1970s.

International honours
Kersey-Brown won two caps for Wales (RL) while at Huddersfield in 1968–69.

Playing career
Kersey-Brown played as a school boy and gained Welsh Caps. He lived in Penmaenmawr, North Wales, and a few of his later team members in London Welsh knew him there and played rugby with him, such as Tony Gray. The London Welsh Team was led by John Dawes who had a specific training programme in the early 1960s which honed the team and contributed later to the success of The British Lions team 1971-73.

The secret of their success was the injection of John Dawes. Many of the team had been together as Rugby School Boys and had won Welsh Caps from that time as Kersey-Brown had done. He was tall and very swift and had a natural athletic ability. He played in the centre and wings to utilise his tremendous running. The games at London Welsh were very exciting and entertaining and drew bigger crowds as time went on. He was with London Welsh during its enormous upturn in success in 1962-67 but left to turn professional; something in those days was severely frowned upon by Unionists.

Kersey-Brown joined Huddersfield in November 1967. His playing was known for its swiftness and weaving in and around players to get to his tries. The modern team has a venue is completely different from the original venue and a comparison would be a very interesting and historically useful research for someone to do. He did well at first at Fartown but he was badly injured and he left in 1972. He also had a brief spell at Oldham in 1970. He died of cancer on 23 or 24 November 2015, aged 73 or 75 (reports conflict).

Genealogical information
Alex Kersey-Brown's marriage to Cynthia B. (née McLaglen) was registered during first ¼ 1965 in Westminster district. They had children; Nadia Kersey-Brown (birth regsietered during third ¼  in Hounslow district, and Marcus Stuart Kersey-Brown (birth regsietered during fourth ¼  in Huddersfield district). Alex Kersey-Brown's marriage to Avril A. (née Dyson) was registered during third ¼ 1978 in Huddersfield district.

References

External links
(archived by web.archive.org) Statistics at orl-heritagetrust.org.uk

1942 births
2015 deaths
English people of Welsh descent
English rugby league players
English rugby union players
Footballers who switched code
Huddersfield Giants players
London Welsh RFC players
Oldham R.L.F.C. players
Rugby league centres
Rugby league players from Bristol
Rugby league wingers
Rugby union centres
Rugby union players from Bristol
Rugby union wings
Wales national rugby league team players